Neacerea pusilla is a moth in the subfamily Arctiinae. It was described by Arthur Gardiner Butler in 1878. It is found in the Amazon region.

References

Arctiidae genus list at Butterflies and Moths of the World of the Natural History Museum

Moths described in 1878
Arctiinae